John Randolph Thune (born January 7, 1961) is an American politician serving as the senior United States senator from South Dakota, a seat he has held since 2005. Thune is in his fourth Senate term and is the Senate minority whip, a post he has held since 2021.

Thune has worked in politics and civic organizations since completing his MBA degree. He is known for his defeat of sitting Senate Democratic Leader Tom Daschle in 2004. In the U.S. Senate, Thune served as the Republican chief deputy whip from 2007 to 2009 and chaired the Senate Republican Policy Committee from 2009 to 2012. He served as the Senate Republican Conference chair, the third-ranking position in the Senate, from 2012 to 2019.

The Senate Republican Conference selected Thune as majority whip for the 116th Congress; he succeeded Senator John Cornyn of Texas, who was term-limited in the position. In 2020, he was chosen as minority whip for the 117th Congress.

Early life, education, and early political career
Thune was born in Pierre, South Dakota, the son of Yvonne Patricia (née Bodine) and Harold Richard Thune. Harold Thune was a fighter pilot in the Pacific theater during World War II who flew the Grumman F6F Hellcat; he was awarded the Distinguished Flying Cross after shooting down four enemy planes. Harold Thune flew his missions off the USS Intrepid. Thune's paternal grandfather, Nicholas Thune, was an immigrant from Norway who partnered with his brother to start Thune Hardware stores in Mitchell and Murdo, South Dakota. Thune's maternal grandfather was from Ontario, Canada, and his mother was born in Saskatchewan.

Thune was a star athlete in high school, active in basketball, track, and football. He graduated from Jones County High School in 1979. He played college basketball at Biola University in California, from which he graduated in 1983 with a Bachelor of Arts degree in business. Thune received a Master of Business Administration degree from the University of South Dakota in 1984.

After completing his MBA, Thune became involved in politics. He worked as a legislative aide for U.S. Senator James Abdnor from 1985 to 1987. 

In 1989, Thune moved to Pierre, where he served as executive director of the state Republican Party for two years. Thune was appointed Railroad Director of South Dakota by Governor George S. Mickelson, serving from 1991 to 1993. From 1993 to 1996, he was executive director of the South Dakota Municipal League.

U.S. House of Representatives (1997–2003)

Elections
Thune began his political career in 1996 by entering the race for South Dakota's lone seat in the U.S. House of Representatives. The Almanac of American Politics said that Thune "entered the 1996 race as very much an underdog." His opponent in the Republican primary was sitting Lieutenant Governor Carole Hillard of Rapid City, who benefited from the support of the longtime South Dakota Governor Bill Janklow. A May 1996 poll showed Hillard leading Thune by a margin of 69%-15%. By relying on strong personal skills and the help of his old network of Abdnor friends, Thune won the primary, defeating Hillard 59%-41%. In the general election, Thune defeated Democrat Rick Weiland, a long-serving aide to U.S. Senator Tom Daschle, 58%-37%.

Thune won his subsequent races for U.S. House by wide margins. He was reelected in 1998 with 75% of the vote and in 2000 with 73% of the vote. In 2002, after briefly considering a run for governor, Thune set his sights on a run for the U.S. Senate.

U.S. Senate (2005–present)

Elections

2002

In 2002, Thune challenged incumbent Democratic U.S. Senator Tim Johnson. Thune lost by only 524 votes (0.15%). One study concluded: "While the margin of victory [for Johnson] was a mere 524 votes, getting into that winning position required a number of important factors, including Native American turnout, the ability of Johnson and his allies to more effectively use the ground war to get their message out, Thune's ineffectiveness on the air and lack of experience in winning competitive elections, low voter turnout in key Republican counties, the drought, and finally the presence of Kurt Evans. Evans, a Libertarian candidate who withdrew from the race, endorsed Thune, but remained on the ballot and siphoned away more votes from Thune than Johnson. Evans received only 3,070 votes, but that ended up being six times greater than the margin of victory." Despite the close results, Thune did not contest the election.

2004

In 2004 Thune challenged Tom Daschle, the United States Senate Minority Leader and leader of the Senate Democrats. In early 2003, Daschle had unexpectedly decided not to run for president. CNN reported that the "announcement surprised even some of his closest aides, one of whom told CNN plans were being made for Daschle to announce his candidacy Saturday in his hometown of Aberdeen, South Dakota."

The 2004 U.S. Senate race in South Dakota was the most expensive Senate race that year, with a total of $30 million spent, and the most expensive race in South Dakota history. It was widely followed in the national media. Thune, along with Senate Majority Leader Bill Frist, President George W. Bush, and Vice President Dick Cheney, described Daschle as the "chief obstructionist" of Bush's agenda: "Thune was able to criticize 'Daschle for serving incompatible masters' and portray him, as Frist did when he came to South Dakota to campaign for Thune, as a partisan obstructionist and political heir to liberal icon and former Senator George McGovern of South Dakota."

Daschle's critics charged the Democrat with using filibusters to block confirmation of several of Bush's nominees to the federal judiciary and of being out of step with South Dakota voters on other political and social issues: "The GOP had targeted Daschle, the Senate minority leader, claiming he had been the chief obstruction to President Bush on such issues as tax cuts, judicial nominees and the war in Iraq."

On November 2, 2004, Thune defeated Daschle by 4,508 votes, winning 51% of the vote. Daschle's loss was the first ousting of an incumbent floor leader since 1952, when Arizona Senator Ernest McFarland lost to Barry Goldwater. The loss made Daschle "the first Senate party leader in more than five decades to be voted out of office".

South Dakota native Tom Brokaw commented that Thune "ran a very strong campaign" to win the 2004 race. University of South Dakota political scientist Bill Richardson said, "motivated John Thune supporters went to the polls in large numbers, part of a massive South Dakota turnout. Unofficial results show nearly 80 percent of registered voters cast ballots."

After Thune defeated Daschle, many Republicans regarded him as a "rising star with unlimited political potential."

2010

Thune was re-elected 2010 without any opposition in either the primary or general elections. Scott Heidepriem, the South Dakota Senate Minority Leader and a Democratic candidate for Governor of South Dakota, said, "We just concluded that John Thune is an extremely popular senator who is going to win another term in the Senate." The conservative publication Townhall commented that the absence of a Democratic candidate in the election marked "the first time in the state's modern history in which a major party has failed to field a Senate candidate."

2016

In 2016 Thune faced Democratic candidate Jay Williams, Chair of the Yankton County Democratic Party. On November 8, 2016, Thune defeated Williams, winning 71.8% of the vote.

2022

Thune "drew the wrath of Donald Trump for pushing back on the former president's false claims" that he won the 2020 presidential election. Trump called upon South Dakota Governor Kristi Noem to primary Thune in the 2022 U.S. Senate election in South Dakota; Noem declined. Thune also received negative feedback from Trump supporters for his position on the 2020 election.

While Thune seriously considered retiring from the Senate, he announced in January 2022 that he would seek reelection to a fourth term.

Tenure
On December 6, 2006, Thune was chosen by Senate Republican Whip Trent Lott to be the GOP's Chief Deputy Whip. After briefly serving as Republican Conference Vice-Chairman, Thune became chairman of the Republican Policy Committee in June 2009. The post was the fourth-ranking position in the Senate.

In March 2009, Thune was one of 14 senators to vote against a procedural move that essentially guaranteed a major expansion of a national service corps. The Congressional Budget Office estimated that the bill would cost at least $418 million in the fiscal year 2010 and $5.7 billion from 2010 to 2014.

He was elected Republican Conference Chairman in 2011, taking office in January 2012. The Conference Chairman is the third-ranking position in the US Senate. In late 2011, the Mitchell Daily Republic reported that "Thune's elevation to the No. 3 spot makes him the highest-ranking Republican senator in South Dakota history. Thune has served as chairman of the Republican Policy Committee from 2009 until the present time and was vice chairman of the Republican Conference from 2008 to 2009 and the Republican chief deputy whip from 2006 to 2008."

Thune's emergence as a conservative voice in the Senate gained him a lengthy profile in the conservative magazine The Weekly Standard. The American Conservative Union gave Senator Thune a rating of 100 in 2006 and again in 2010. As of 2020 Thune's lifetime ACU rating was 84.11. Thune was praised in a 2010 Weekly Standard profile as an exceptional politician who was, unlike many of his colleagues, able to communicate traditional conservatism, making him a popular alternative to Tea Party representatives.

In June 2018, Thune called on Special Counsel Robert Mueller to "start winding" down his investigation into Russian interference in the 2016 presidential election.

Thune is South Dakota's senior U.S. senator. The Senate Republican Conference selected Thune as majority whip for the 116th Congress, succeeding John Cornyn, who was term-limited in the position. He serves as minority whip in the 117th Congress.

Committee assignments
 Committee on Agriculture, Nutrition and Forestry
 Subcommittee on Rural Revitalization, Conservation, Forestry and Credit
 Subcommittee on Energy, Science and Technology
 Subcommittee on Production, Income Protection and Price Support
 Committee on Finance
 United States Senate Finance Subcommittee on International Trade, Customs, and Global Competitiveness
 Committee on Commerce, Science, and Transportation (Chair)
 Subcommittee on Aviation Operations, Safety, and Security
 Subcommittee on Communications, Technology, and the Internet
 Subcommittee on Competitiveness, Innovation, and Export Promotion
 Subcommittee on Consumer Protection, Product Safety, and Insurance
 Subcommittee on Science and Space
 Subcommittee on Surface Transportation and Merchant Marine Infrastructure, Safety, and Security
 Committee on Budget

Caucus membership
 Afterschool Caucuses

Political positions

Agriculture 
In March 2019, Thune was one of 38 senators to sign a letter to U.S. Secretary of Agriculture Sonny Perdue warning that dairy farmers "have continued to face market instability and are struggling to survive the fourth year of sustained low prices" and urging his department to "strongly encourage these farmers to consider the Dairy Margin Coverage program."

Drug policy 
In December 2017, Thune was one of six senators to sign a letter to Senate Majority Leader Mitch McConnell and Minority Leader Chuck Schumer requesting their "help in ensuring the long-term sustainability of the 340B program", a rule mandating that drug companies give discounts to health-care organizations presently serving large numbers of low-income patients.

Economy
In January 2019, Thune introduced legislation to repeal the estate tax, which applies to couples with estates above $22 million (it is estimated that approximately 1,700 families pay the tax annually).

Education 
In February 2019, Thune was one of 20 senators to sponsor the Employer Participation in Repayment Act, enabling employers to contribute up to $5,250 to their employees' student loans.

Energy
On March 6, 2014, Thune introduced the Reliable Home Heating Act (S. 2086; 113th Congress). The bill would require the Federal Motor Carrier Safety Administration (FMCSA) to exempt motor carriers that transport home heating oil from numerous federal safety regulations if the governor of a state declares a state of emergency caused by a shortage of residential heating fuel. The bill also would require the Energy Information Administration (EIA) to notify states if certain petroleum reserves fall below historical averages.

Environment 
In March 2019, Thune joined all Senate Republicans, three Democrats, and Angus King in voting against the Green New Deal resolution. Arguing against its implementation, Thune said the resolution would "absolutely be devastating and disastrous" for the agriculture economy both in South Dakota and across the US.

Facebook
In May 2016, Thune sent Facebook a letter requesting details on how it operates its Trending Topics feature. This followed a Gizmodo article that cited anonymous sources (claiming to be former Facebook employees) who alleged a systemic anti-conservative political bias in how material is selected for display in the list.

Some commentators criticized Thune's letter as an example of government overreach against a private company. Facebook denied the bias allegations. Thune thanked Facebook in a public statement.

Foreign policy 
In November 2006, Thune said he believed the US could win the Iraq War through stability. He elaborated, "It's making sure that Iraq can't be a staging ground for terrorist attacks against its neighbors in the region or, worse yet, against the United States." Thune also espoused the position that the Bush administration and a majority of members of Congress would grant military commanders the final decision on when to reduce U.S. military forces there. In July 2008, Thune said that the Bush administration's moves in Iraq had been a "remarkable success", noting civilian casualties had been reduced by 80 percent, and charged Democratic presidential candidate and Senator Barack Obama with failing "to acknowledge the basic fact of the success and result and progress and gains that have been made as a result of the surge."

In December 2010, Thune was one of 26 senators who voted against the ratification of New START, a nuclear arms reduction treaty between the United States and the Russian Federation obliging both countries to have no more than 1,550 strategic warheads and 700 launchers deployed during the next seven years, and providing for a continuation of on-site inspections that halted when START I expired the previous year. It was the first arms treaty with Russia in eight years.

In November 2012, Thune and Chuck Grassley requested that United States Secretary of the Treasury Timothy Geithner provide a review of the Chinese company Wanxiang Group's plan to acquire bankrupt battery maker A123, arguing that the transaction should be reviewed to ensure that U.S. military and taxpayer interests in A123 were protected. In October 2018, Thune requested staff briefings about a Bloomberg report that the Chinese government had implanted malicious hardware into server motherboards, writing charges that "the U.S. hardware supply chain has been purposely tampered with by a foreign power [and] must be taken seriously."

In September 2016, Thune was one of 34 senators to sign a letter to United States Secretary of State John Kerry advocating that the United States use "all available tools to dissuade Russia from continuing its airstrikes in Syria" from an Iranian airbase near Hamadan and stating that the airstrikes violated "a legally binding Security Council Resolution" on Iran.

In June 2017, Thune co-sponsored the Israel Anti-Boycott Act (s. 720), which made it a federal crime, punishable by a maximum sentence of 20 years imprisonment, for Americans to encourage or participate in boycotts against the Israeli government and Israeli settlements in the occupied Palestinian territories.

In March 2018, Thune voted to table a resolution spearheaded by Bernie Sanders, Chris Murphy, and Mike Lee that would have required President Trump to withdraw American troops either in or influencing Yemen within the next 30 days unless they were combating Al-Qaeda.

In May 2020, a group of Senate Republicans planned to introduce a privacy bill that would regulate the data COVID-19 contact-tracing apps collect. Senator Roger Wicker said the legislation would “hold businesses accountable to consumers if they use personal data to fight the COVID-19 pandemic.” The act would permit the creation of “platforms that could trace the virus and help flatten the curve and stop the spread—and maintaining privacy protections for U.S. citizens,” Thune said.

After the 2022 Russian invasion of Ukraine, Thune said that the Ukrainian people could not sustain the war without military support from the U.S. and other countries. He called on European partners to make robust contributions to help Ukraine.

Health care
Thune was part of the group of 13 senators drafting the Senate version of the American Health Care Act behind closed doors.

In July 2017 Thune said that Republicans would continue trying to repeal the Affordable Care Act regardless of whether that month's effort collapsed: "We are going to vote to repeal and replace Obamacare. It’s not a question of if, it’s a question of when."

Gun control
Thune is a strong advocate of gun rights, sponsoring legislation that would allow individuals with concealed carry permits to use such permits as a valid permit in other states. He also voted against banning high-capacity magazines of over 10 bullets.

On October 3, 2017, Thune became the center of media attention for his response to the mass shooting in Las Vegas. "It sounds like [the shooter] used conversion kits and other things, you know, to make the weapons more lethal," he said. "We'll look at the facts when we get them all in here. I think a lot of us want to do everything we can to prevent tragedies like that from happening again. You know, it's an open society. And when somebody does what he wants to do it's going to be hard to prevent anything. But I think people are going to have to take steps in their own lives to take precautions. To protect themselves. And in situations like that, you know, try to stay safe. As somebody said, get small."

Judiciary
In March 2016, about seven months before the next presidential election, Thune declared his opposition to considering President Obama's nominee to the Supreme Court, saying, "the next president should make this lifetime appointment to the Supreme Court" because the "American people deserve to have their voices heard on the nomination of the next Supreme Court justice".

In September 2020, less than two months before the next presidential election, Thune supported an immediate vote on Trump's nominee to fill the Supreme Court vacancy caused by Justice Ruth Bader Ginsburg's death.

Trade 
In January 2018 Thune was one of 36 Republican senators to sign a letter to President Trump requesting he preserve the North American Free Trade Agreement by modernizing it for the economy of the 21st century.

In July 2018, as the Trump administration pushed for aid for agricultural producers affected by retaliatory tariffs, Thune stated that the plan offered a "false and short-term" sense of security and cited the importance of fair and free trade for farmers in South Dakota.

2020 presidential election results
In December 2020, Thune made national news when he said that he opposed any further efforts to challenge the 2020 presidential election results. He argued that such efforts would "go down like a shot dog" in the Senate. Then-President Donald Trump, who contended that the election results were illegitimate and that he had defeated Democratic nominee Joe Biden, responded by attacking Thune on Twitter, Thune voted to certify the 2020 presidential election results.

2021 United States Capitol riot
On May 28, 2021, Thune voted against creating an independent commission to investigate the January 6 capitol riot.

Presidential and vice-presidential speculation
Prior to the selection of Sarah Palin, Thune was mentioned as a possible vice presidential pick for Republican nominee John McCain in the 2008 presidential election. Thune publicly played down the speculation.

Significant speculation arose regarding a potential 2012 presidential bid by Thune. He was encouraged to run by Senate Minority Leader Mitch McConnell, and South Carolina Senator Lindsey Graham, who called him "a consensus builder." One Wall Street Journal article stated that Thune had "name ID in the parts of the first caucus state of Iowa that get neighboring South Dakota media, a $6.9 million bank account he could use for a presidential run, and a national fundraising list of 100,000 names from his race against [former Senator Tom] Daschle." DNC Executive Director Jennifer O'Malley Dillon publicly stated that "among a field of generally flawed (in one way or another) Republican presidential candidates, Thune was the one candidate that she feared. According to multiple commentators, Thune's candidacy could be helped by his personal appearance. On February 22, 2011, Thune announced he would not run in 2012.

During the summer of 2012, the USA Today reported that Thune was on Mitt Romney's short list as a potential running mate, but Wisconsin Congressman Paul Ryan was selected instead.

Despite some speculation, Thune declined to seek the White House in 2016, stating that his "window...might have closed in 2012."

Electoral history

Personal life
Thune is an evangelical Christian. He married Kimberley Weems of Doland, South Dakota in 1984. The Thunes have two daughters and several grandchildren.

Thune is physically active and has frequently competed in running events. A 2012 Runner's World Magazine feature called Thune "the fastest man in Congress since 2009."

Thune is a fan of the bands Styx, Journey, Boston, and the Doobie Brothers.

References

Further reading
 Lauck, Jon K.  Daschle Vs. Thune: Anatomy of a High Plains Senate Race University of Oklahoma Press (September 30, 2007). .

External links
 Senator John Thune official U.S. Senate website
 John Thune for Senate
 
 

|-

|-

|-

|-

|-

|-

|-

|-

|-

|-

|-

|-

|-

|-

1961 births
Living people
21st-century American politicians
21st-century evangelicals
American evangelicals
American gun rights activists
American people of Canadian descent
American people of Norwegian descent
Biola University alumni
Members of the United States House of Representatives from South Dakota
People from Jones County, South Dakota
Politicians from Sioux Falls, South Dakota
Republican Party members of the United States House of Representatives from South Dakota
Republican Party United States senators from South Dakota
Small Business Administration personnel
State cabinet secretaries of South Dakota
University of South Dakota alumni
United States congressional aides